Juan José Laboriel López (July 9, 1942 – September 18, 2013), known as Johnny Laboriel, was a Mexican rock and roll singer. His career started in 1958, when at 16 years old he joined the rock and roll group "Los Rebeldes del Rock".

Laboriel died on September 18, 2013 from prostate cancer.

Life and family
Laboriel was the son of actor and composer Juan José Laboriel and actress Francisca López de Laboriel. Their parents were Garifuna immigrants from Honduras. He  was the brother of bassist Abraham Laboriel and singer Ella Laboriel.

Discography
Melodía de Amor
La Hiedra Venenosa
Cuando Florezcan los Manzanos
Historia de Amor
El Chico Danielito
Muévanse Todos (vocalista Roberto "Baby" Moreno)
Rock del Angelito (Rockin' Little Angel Cover)
La Bamba
Yakety Yack
Recuerdas Cuando
Kansas City
Corre Sansón Corre

Collaborations
In 2004, Laboriel was invited by Alex Lora to participate in the 36th anniversary of his band El Tri. The concert was presented at the Auditorio Nacional and is available in CD and DVD as 35 Años y lo que falta todavía.

In 2006 Johnny Laboriel was invited by Luis Álvarez "El Haragán" to participate in the 16th anniversary of his band, El Haragán y Compañía. The concert was presented on November 3, 2006, also at Mexico City's Teatro Metropólitan.

Death
Johnny Laboriel died on 18 September 2013, in Mexico City, from prostate cancer. He is survived by his wife Vivianne Thirion, and sons Juan Francisco and Emmanuel.

References

External links
 Official website
 

1942 births
2013 deaths
Deaths from prostate cancer
Mexican male singers
Garifuna people
Mexican rock musicians
Rock en Español musicians